The Lookout Mountain Incline Railway is a  inclined plane funicular railway leading to the top of Lookout Mountain from the historic St. Elmo neighborhood of Chattanooga, Tennessee. Passengers are transported from St. Elmo's Station at the base, to Point Park at the mountain summit, which overlooks the city and the Tennessee River. It is just a short drive to three of Chattanooga's main tourist attractions, Ruby Falls, Cavern Castle, and Rock City. It has a maximum grade of 72.7%, making it one of the world's steepest passenger railways. It obtained Historic Mechanical Engineering Landmark status in 1991. The cable system for the cars was made by the Otis Elevator Company.

History
The Lookout Mountain Incline Railway (Incline No. 2) was opened on November 16, 1895, by the Chattanooga Incline and Lula Lake Railway and functions as a major mode of transportation to the top of the mountain. It was the second of two inclines constructed on Lookout Mountain; the first was the Chattanooga and Lookout Mountain Railway (Incline No. 1), which operated from 1886 to 1895 and dismantled in 1900. Service was disrupted twice by fires that destroyed the powerhouse, upper station and cars stored there overnight (the first fire occurring on December 13, 1896, and the second on March 24, 1919). Both fires put the railway temporarily out of service, substitute service being provided by the Chattanooga Railway and Light Company's Lookout Mountain route. The railway was sold in the 1940s to Southern Coach Lines and is now operated by the Chattanooga Area Regional Transportation Authority, the area's public transit agency.

The Incline Railway is a well-known and beloved Chattanooga landmark; the railway has been depicted in numerous regional and national publications, including being on TV, most prominently on Larry the Cable Guy's Only in America with Larry the Cable Guy in February 2011. The railway is one of the main tourist attractions in the Chattanooga area, totaling over 100,000 visits annually. The top station features an observation deck and a gift shop.

See also
 List of funicular railways
 Otis Elevating Railway

References

External links

 Lookout Mountain Incline Railway official web site
 HawkinsRails' Lookout Mtn Incline Railway page

Funicular railways in the United States
Heritage railroads in Tennessee
Lookout Mountain
Historic Mechanical Engineering Landmarks
Transportation in Hamilton County, Tennessee
National Register of Historic Places in Tennessee
Railway inclines in the United States
Standard gauge railways in the United States
Tourist attractions in Hamilton County, Tennessee
1895 establishments in Tennessee
National Register of Historic Places in Chattanooga, Tennessee
Cableways on the National Register of Historic Places
Rail infrastructure on the National Register of Historic Places in Tennessee